Gnorimoschema dryosyrta is a moth in the family Gelechiidae. It was described by Edward Meyrick in 1931. It is found in Sikkim, India.

References

Gnorimoschema
Moths described in 1931